Persatuan Sepakbola Sumedang (simply known as Perses) is an Indonesian football club based in Sumedang, West Java. They currently compete in the Liga 3.

2010/2011 squad

Supporter
The S-man (fullname: Sumedang Mania) is supporter of Perses Sumedang.

References

External links
 
 

1950 establishments in Indonesia
Association football clubs established in 1950
Football clubs in Indonesia
Football clubs in West Java
Sport in West Java
Indonesian Premier Division